Rachel  and Amanda Pace (identical twins, born October 6, 2000) are American twin actresses. They are mostly known for playing the role of  Hope Logan in the soap opera The Bold and the Beautiful and as Nancy Botwin‘s nieces Shayla and Taylor Grey in the TV series Weeds. They are the daughters of Mike, a computer technician, and Jennifer Pace, a personal banking officer. They have an older brother, Matthew.

The girls started making commercials and, when they were 2 years old, were cast in The Young and the Restless as Abby Carlton. A couple of months later, they got their first big role playing Hope Logan in The Bold and the Beautiful, a role they kept from 2004 to 2009.

Rachel filmography

Amanda filmography

References

External links

2000 births
Living people
American soap opera actresses
Actresses from California
People from Brea, California
American twins
Identical twin actresses
American child actresses
21st-century American actresses